Ardskenish is a hamlet on the island of Colonsay, in the civil parish of Colonsay and Oronsay, in the council area of Argyll and Bute, Scotland.

History 
The name "Ardskenish" may mean "Skiði's headland", being Norse and "àird" being added tautologically from Gaelic.

References

External links 
 

Hamlets in Argyll and Bute
Colonsay